The name Nevrakis is a Greek surname of Greek origin.

Description
The name has its origin from a feud in Greece. The Turks and the Greeks were fighting for possession of parcels of land on the Island of Crete. Some of the Turks had barricaded off a section of land. Several of the Greeks in the ensuing fight were wounded but successful in winning possession of the land. 

Greek-language surnames
Surnames